Oscarinus is a genus of scarab beetles in the family Scarabaeidae. There are about 19 described species in Oscarinus, found in North, Central, and South America.

Species
These 19 species belong to the genus Oscarinus:

 Oscarinus abusus (Fall, 1907)
 Oscarinus bottimeri (Cartwright, 1957)
 Oscarinus brimleyi (Cartwright, 1939)
 Oscarinus cabreroi Dellacasa, Dellacasa & Gordon, 2013
 Oscarinus crassuloides (Fall, 1907)
 Oscarinus crassulus (Horn, 1870)
 Oscarinus floridanus (Robinson, 1947)
 Oscarinus indutilis (Harold, 1874)
 Oscarinus lodingi (Cartwright, 1957)
 Oscarinus matiganae (Paulsen, 2006)
 Oscarinus odocoilis (Robinson, 1939)
 Oscarinus pseudabusus (Cartwright, 1957)
 Oscarinus rusicola (Melsheimer, 1845)
 Oscarinus silvanicus (Cartwright, 1972)
 Oscarinus spiniclypeus (Hinton, 1934)
 Oscarinus stuessyi Gordon & Skelley, 2007
 Oscarinus texensis (Cartwright, 1972)
 Oscarinus welderi Gordon & Skelley, 2007
 Oscarinus windsori (Cartwright, 1939)

References

Scarabaeidae
Scarabaeidae genera